Mark Stewart is a New York City-based multi-instrumentalist, composer, singer and instrument designer.

He has been a member of the Bang on a Can All-Stars, the Fred Frith Guitar Quartet, Steve Reich and Musicians, Zeena Parkins' Gangster Band, and Arnold Dreyblatt's Orchestra of Excited Strings. Stewart is a founding member of the Bang on a Can All-Stars band and The Jerry Wortman Nonette. Also, he has worked with Paul Simon, Anthony Braxton, Bob Dylan, Cecil Taylor, Meredith Monk, Philip Glass, Bruce Springsteen, Edie Brickell, Don Byron, Paul McCartney, Marc Ribot, and in the duo Polygraph Lounge with Rob Schwimmer, with whom he also contributed to Simon & Garfunkel's "Old Friends" reunion concert tour. He plays many experimental and lesser-used instruments, such as the daxophone and theremin.

Stewart lives in Brooklyn, New York.

Selected discography

With Bang on a Can
'Bang on a Can Live, Vol. 2 (Composers Recordings Inc., 1993)Bang on a Can Live, Vol. 3 (Composers Recordings Inc., 1994)
Industry (Sony Classical, 1995)
Cheating, Lying, Stealing (Sony Classical, 1996)
Music For Airports - Brian Eno (Point Music, 1998)
Renegade Heaven (Cantaloupe, 2000)
Steve Reich: New York Counterpoint; Eight Lines; Four Organs (Nonesuch, 2000)
Terry Riley - In C (Cantaloupe, 2001)
Classics (Cantaloupe, 2002)
Bang On A Can & Don Byron - A Ballad For Many (Cantaloupe, 2006)

With Fred Frith Guitar Quartet
Ayaya Moses (1997, CD, Ambiances Magnétiques, Canada) - e-guitar
Upbeat (1999, CD, Ambiances Magnétiques, Canada) - e-guitar

With Paul Simon
You're The One (Warner Bros., 2000) - dobro, banjo, sitar, cello, trumpet, pedal steel
So Beautiful or So What  (Hear Music, 2011) - saxophone, vocals, wind instruments, e-guitar
Live In New York City (Hear Music, 2012 - e-guitar, saxophone, wind instrumentsWith Zeena ParkinsMouth=Maul=Betrayer (Tzadik, 1996) - guitar, mandolin, cello 
Pan-Acousticon (Tzadik, 1999) - guitar, cello, daxophoneWith Ted ReichmanEmigré (Tzadik, 2003) - e-guitar, cello, mandocello, tenor banjoWith Evan Ziporyn'''Gamelan Galak Tika (New World Records, 2000) - e-guitar, metallophoneAmok!, Tire Fire (New World Records, 2000) - e-guitar, metallophoneShadowBang'' (Cantaloupe Music, 2003) - e-guitar

References

American classical guitarists
American male guitarists
American folk guitarists
American rock guitarists
American multi-instrumentalists
Year of birth missing (living people)
Living people
Contemporary classical music performers
Place of birth missing (living people)